David Garland (born 18 June 1948) is an English former professional footballer who played as a forward.

References

1948 births
Living people
Footballers from Grimsby
English footballers
Association football forwards
Grimsby Town F.C. players
Scunthorpe United F.C. players
Boston Town F.C. players
Skegness Town A.F.C. players
English Football League players